Trekhizbinka is a rural locality (a selo) in Novotuzukleysky Selsoviet, Kamyzyaksky District, Astrakhan Oblast, Russia. The population was 199 as of 2010. There is 1 street.

Geography 
Trekhizbinka is located 40 km east of Kamyzyak (the district's administrative centre) by road. Tuzukley is the nearest rural locality.

References 

Rural localities in Kamyzyaksky District